The 2018 America East Conference baseball tournament was held from May 23 to 26, 2018. The top six teams out of the league's seven members met in the double-elimination tournament held at Mahaney Diamond in Orono, Maine, the home park of Maine. As tournament champion, Hartford received the conference's automatic bid into the 2018 NCAA Division I baseball tournament.

Seeding and format
The top six teams from the regular season are seeded one through six based on conference winning percentage only. The No. 1 and No. 2 seeds receive a first-round bye. The teams then play a double-elimination tournament.

Bracket

References

Tournament
America East Conference Baseball Tournament
America East Conference Baseball
America East Conference baseball tournament
Sports in Orono, Maine
Baseball competitions in Maine